This is a list of foreign players that have played in the Albanian First Division. The following players:
have played at least one game for the respective club. The players written with bold text have at least one cap for their national team.

Argentina 
 Bruno Fistori – Terbuni (2013)
 Federico Mazur – Shkumbini (2014)
 Diego Rovira – Shkumbini (2014)

Bosnia and Herzegovina 
 Ibrahim Arifović – Kastrioti (2015)

Brazil 
 Jacques Aguiar – Kamza (2015–2016)
 Leo Carioca – Adriatiku (2015)
 Júlio César – Burreli (2014)
 Cate Fonseca – Adriatiku (2014–2015), Kamza (2015)
 Luiz Henrique – Bylis (2017–)
 De Lacerda – Terbuni (2013–2014)
 Léo Lelis – Kamza (2016–2017)
 Mauricio – Terbuni (2013), Elbasani (2014)
 Pedro Misteri – Sopoti (2015–2016)
 Nilton de Paula – Dinamo (2012), Naftëtari (2015)
 Pericles – Sopoti (2014), Adriatiku (2015), Pogradeci (2015–2016)
 Leandro Santos – Burreli (2014), Naftëtari (2015)
 Denis da Silva – Adriatiku (2014)
 Wellyson – Tirana (2017–)

Bulgaria 
 Ferdi Myumyunov – Sopoti (2015), Turbina (2015)

Cameroon 
 Mohamadolu Abdouraman – Bylis (2007–2008, 2009), Gramozi (2008)
 Mengwa Akamba – Turbina (2007–2008), Naftëtari (2009), Bylis (2009–2010)
 Joseph Asong – Elbasani (2015–2016)
 Janot Tadjong – Sopoti (2016), Terbuni (2017–)
 Jules Samnda – Bylis (2017–)
 Herve Tchokote – Turbina (2008–2009)

Congo 
 Hardy Binguila – Tirana (2017–)

Croatia 
 Matko Djarmati – Dinamo (2012–2014), Terbuni (2014–2015), Kastrioti (2015–2016)

England 
 Michael Ngoo – Tirana (2017–)

Equatorial Guinea 
 Kelvin Onosiughe – Turbina (2015)

Georgia 
 Ioseb Chakhvashvili – Korabi (2017–)

Germany 
 Vesel Limaj – Bylis (2017–)

Ghana 
 Francis Lamptey – Burreli (2017–)

Guinea 
 Mouss Bangoura – Pogradeci (2016–2017), Besëlidhja (2017–)
 Isaac Camara – Besa (2016–2017), Besëlidhja (2017–)
 Oumar Camara – Besa (2016), Besëlidhja (2017–)
 Sekou Camara – Besëlidhja (2016–2017)
 Cheikh Conte – Pogradeci (2016–2017), Besëlidhja (2017–)
 Olivier Doré – Besa (2016), Besëlidhja (2017–)
 Lancinet Sidibe – Besëlidhja (2016–2017)

Guinea-Bissau 
 Moisés – Gramshi (2012–2013)

Japan 
 Ryo Kato – Kamza (2017)

Kosovo 
 Flamur Bajrami – Tirana (2017–)
 Alban Dragusha – Besa (2012)
 Ruhan Foniqi – Tomori (2014)
 Alush Gavazaj – Bylis (2015)
 Pleurat Hajdini – Besa (2014)
 Rinor Humolli – Kamza (2013–2014)
 Albert Kaqiku – Dinamo (2013)
 Senad Mehmeti – Besa (2012)
 Arbnor Sefiu – Kamza (2013)
 Veton Shabani – Besa (2017–)
 Alban Tusuni – Besa (2011–2012)

Macedonia 
 Nedžat Dražanin – Bilisht (2008–2009), Pogradeci (2009–2012), Butrinti (2013)
 Ertan Hasan – Besëlidhja (2016)
 Altin Lloga – Kamza (2015)
 Vanche Manchevski – Elbasani (2010), Besa (2012)
 Nikola Tripunovski – Apolonia (2013)
 Perica Vasilevski – Apolonia (2013)

Montenegro 
 Enis Djokovic – Terbuni (2014)
 Vladan Giljen – Terbuni (2015), Kastrioti (2015)
 Simo Goranović – Ada (2014)
 Miroslav Kaluđerović – Terbuni (2014–2015)
 Vuk Kovačević – Ada (2014)
 Zenel Radaj – Burreli (2007–2011)

Nigeria 
 Sulaimon Adekunle – Apolonia (2013–2014)
 Abraham Alechenwu – Adriatiku (2014–2015),  Kamza (2015–2016)
 Morrise Anayo – Apolonia (2013–2014)
 Sodiq Atanda – Apolonia (2013–2014, 2015)
 Christian Chukwuka – Bylis (2016–)
 Nifemi Dumoye – Kastrioti (2017–)
 Ifeanyi Edeh – Besa (2012), Gramshi (2013)
 Lukman Hussein – Burreli (2016–2017), Kastrioti (2017–)
 Odirah Ntephe – Bylis (2016–)
 Charles Ofoyen – Apolonia (2007–2008, 2010–2011), Bilisht (2008), Sopoti (2015)
 Chimezie Ogbejesi – Iliria (2017), Burreli (2017–)
 Ambrose Ohadero – Burreli (2007–2008, 2010–2011), Bilisht (2008–2009)
 Joseph Olatunji – Elbasani (2011–2012), Naftëtari (2013), Kamza (2013–2014)
 Chinonso Onuh – Burreli (2016–2017), Tomori (2017–)
 James Osusi – Laçi (2003–2004), Kastrioti (2008–2009), Gramshi (2009–2010), Burreli (2010–2011, 2012)
 Kehinde Owoeye – Kastrioti (2014, 2015)
 Gabriel Steven – Burreli (2013–2014), Terbuni (2014), Kastrioti (2015), Turbina (2015–2016)
 Felix Udoh – Partizani (2013), Kamza (2014), Adriatiku (2014–2015)

Paraguay 
 Wilfrido Gaona – Terbuni (2013)

Portugal 
 Carlos Djaló – Besëlidhja (2016)
 Alberto Seidi – Besëlidhja (2017)

Senegal 
 Maguitte Diop – Besëlidhja (2016)

Serbia 
 Kosta Bajić – Besëlidhja (2015–2016)
 Vilson Caković – Apolonia (2013–2014)
 Milan Djordjevic – Besëlidhja (2012, 2014–2016)
 Stefan Đorđević – Besëlidhja (2017–)
 Mario Gavrilović – Besëlidhja (2011)
 Miloš Jevđević – Apolonia (2010–2011), Kukësi (2011–2012), Terbuni (2011–2013)
 Dejan Lazarević – Apolonia (2015–2016)
 Aleksandar Milić – Besëlidhja (2011–2012, 2013), Luftëtari (2012)
 Vukadin Milunović – Bylis (2010), Kukësi (2011)
 Marko Rajković – Apolonia (2015–2016)
 Aleksandar Stojković – Besëlidhja (2011–2012), Lushnja (2012–2013), Luftëtari (2013–2014)
 Vojislav Trajković – Besëlidhja (2011–2012)
 Bojan Ušumović – Besëlidhja (2015)

South Korea 
 Jeong-Ho Kim – Ada (2015)
 Nak-Hyeon Choi – Ada (2015)
 Yong-jin Lee – Ada (2015)
 Sung-Ho Lim – Ada (2015)

Uganda 
 Tony Mawejje – Tirana (2017–)
 Yunus Sentamu – Tirana (2017–)

Zambia 
 January Zyambo – Besa (2012), Gramshi (2013)

References

 
Albania
 
Association football player non-biographical articles